Bahir Dar Zuria (Amharic ባሕር ዳር ዙሪያ "Greater Bahir Dar Area")  is a woreda in Amhara Region, Ethiopia. Part of the Mirab Gojjam Zone, this woreda is bordered on the south by Yilmana Densa, on the southwest by Mecha, on the northwest by the Gilgel Abay River which separates it from Semien Achefer, on the north by Lake Tana, on the shores of Lake Tana situates the city and special zone of Bahir Dar, and on the east by the Abay River which separates it from the Debub Gondar Zone.

Bahir Dar Zuria includes the forested Zege Peninsula, known for its numerous medieval churches, of which the best known is Ura Kidane Mehret, and associated monasteries. Other points of interest include the Tis Issat falls, and Dilde, better known as the Portuguese Bridge, over the Abay at Alata, about half a mile below the falls. A survey of the land in this woreda shows that 21% is arable or cultivable, 9% pasture, 8% forest or shrubland, 36% covered with water, and the remaining 26% is considered degraded or other. Teff, corn, sorghum, cotton and sesame are important cash crops.

Demographics
Based on the 2007 national census conducted by the Central Statistical Agency of Ethiopia (CSA), this woreda has a total population of 182,730, of whom 93,642 are men and 89,088 women; no urban inhabitants were reported. With an area of 1,443.37 square kilometers, Bahir Dar Zuriya has a population density of 126.60, which is less than the Zone average of 158.25 persons per square kilometer. A total of 40,893 households were counted in this woreda, resulting in an average of 4.47 persons to a household, and 40,097 housing units. The majority of the inhabitants practiced Ethiopian Orthodox Christianity, with 99.7% reporting that as their religion.

The 1994 national census reported a total population for this woreda of 198,284 in 40,391 households, of whom 101,939 were men and 96,345 were women; 8,045 or 4.06% of its population were urban dwellers. The largest ethnic group reported in Bahir Dar Zuria was the Amhara (99.91%). Amharic was spoken as a first language by 99.93%. The majority of the inhabitants practiced Ethiopian Orthodox Christianity, with 98.22% reporting that as their religion, while 1.74% were Muslim.

Notes

Districts of Amhara Region